Stoppila Sunzu (born 22 June 1989), also known as Stophira Sunzu, is a Zambian professional footballer who plays as a centre-back for Shijiazhuang Ever Bright. He scored the winning penalty kick for Zambia in the 2012 Africa Cup of Nations Final.

Early life
Stopilla Sunzu was born in Chingola and is the younger brother of Felix Sunzu and the son of Felix Sunzu Sr, a goalkeeper who was originally from the Democratic Republic of Congo.

Club career

Early career
He began his career with Afrisports of Kitwe. He was discovered at a U-16 tournament in Chambeshi, Zambia and he was referred to Afrisports.

He then joined Konkola Blades under a loan arrangement. After representing Zambia at the 2007 FIFA U-20 World Cup, the 19-year-old was invited for trials at the English side Reading. The Championship side was keen on securing him on a longer deal but due to work permit problems the move did not materialise. He signed a loan contract for Châteauroux in September 2008 and after the end of the season on 30 June 2009 returned to Zanaco FC.

TP Mazembe
In 2010, Sunzu transferred to TP Mazembe of Democratic Republic of Congo. His registration to Zanaco was a loan from Afrisports and there was some initial dispute regarding his move to TP Mazembe but it was eventually resolved. With Mazembe, he won domestic titles as well as the 2010 CAF Champions League. He was sent off in the club's opening 2010 FIFA Club World Cup game. In November 2012, he was shortlisted for the 2012 Africa-based Player of the Year award. In January 2013, he trained with Reading in the English Premier League with a view to being offered a contract. He returned to the 2013 African Cup of Nations without any contract being signed.  Sunzu came to Reading on the premise of being a free agent, with his three-year contract expiring in December 2012. Moses Katumbi, president of TP Mazembe, accused Sunzu's handlers of lying to Reading about his contract stating that it does not expire until 2015.

Stints in France and China
On 6 January 2014, Sunzu joined French Ligue 1 club Sochaux-Montbéliard along with his teammate Nathan Sinkala. He scored important goals but could not prevent the relegation of the French side to Ligue 2.

On 29 December 2014, Sunzu transferred to Chinese Super League side Shanghai Greenland Shenhua. He made his debut and scored his first goal for Shanghai Greenland Shenhua on 8 March 2015, in a 6–2 victory against city rivals Shanghai Shenxin.

Sunzu was loaned to Lille for one year on 28 July 2015. In his first season there, he made 16 appearances scoring twice. On 10 July 2016, he joined Lille permanently on a three-year contract, for an undisclosed fee.

Arsenal Tula loans
On 3 February 2017, Sunzu signed a loan deal with the Russian Premier League club FC Arsenal Tula until the end of the 2016–17 season. At the time of the signing, Arsenal Tula claimed his player rights still belong to Shanghai Greenland Shenhua, and that is the club Arsenal loaned him from, despite earlier reports on him signing a permanent deal with Lille.

In July 2017, he re-joined Arsenal Tula on loan for the 2017–18 season.

Metz

On 9 July 2018, he returned to France, signing a two-year contract with FC Metz. He made his league debut for the club on 30 July 2018, playing all ninety minutes in a 1–0 away victory over Stade Brest. He scored his first competitive goal for the club on 19 October 2018 in a 3–0 league victory over Chamois Niortais. His goal, assisted by Marvin Gakpa, was scored in the 80th minute.

Shijiazhuang Ever Bright
In the 2019–20 winter transfer period, Sunzu left Metz to join Chinese Super League side Shijiazhuang Ever Bright.

International career
Sunzu represented his country at the 2007 FIFA U-20 World Cup in Canada. In that tournament, Zambia defeated an Uruguayan side that featured Luis Suárez and Edinson Cavani.

He made his full international debut against Botswana in a 2009 African Championship of Nations qualifier.

Sunzu scored the winning penalty of the penalty shoot-out in the final of the 2012 African Cup of Nations against Ivory Coast, which Zambia won 8–7.

In October 2013, due to a disagreement between their club TP Mazembe and the Zambian Football Association over international call-ups, Sunzu and two other players (Nathan Sinkala and Rainford Kalaba) were the subject of a Zambian arrest warrant. All three players later had their passports confiscated by Zambian immigration authorities, before being pardoned by the Zambian government.

International goals
Scores and results list Zambia's goal tally first.

Honours
Zanaco
Zambian Premier League: 2009

TP Mazembe
Super Ligue: 2011
CAF Champions League: 2010
CAF Super Cup: 2010,2011

Zambia
Africa Cup of Nations: 2012

Individual
 CAF Team of the Year: 2012

References

External links

1989 births
Living people
People from Chingola
Zambian footballers
Zambian expatriate footballers
Zambia international footballers
Zambian people of Democratic Republic of the Congo descent
Association football defenders
LB Châteauroux players
TP Mazembe players
FC Sochaux-Montbéliard players
Zanaco F.C. players
Shanghai Shenhua F.C. players
Lille OSC players
FC Arsenal Tula players
FC Metz players
Cangzhou Mighty Lions F.C. players
Ligue 1 players
Ligue 2 players
Chinese Super League players
Russian Premier League players
Expatriate footballers in the Democratic Republic of the Congo
Zambian expatriate sportspeople in the Democratic Republic of the Congo
Expatriate footballers in France
Expatriate footballers in China
Zambian expatriate sportspeople in France
Zambian expatriate sportspeople in China
2010 Africa Cup of Nations players
2012 Africa Cup of Nations players
2013 Africa Cup of Nations players
2015 Africa Cup of Nations players
Africa Cup of Nations-winning players
Expatriate footballers in Russia
Zambian expatriate sportspeople in Russia